Eure Javier Yánez Ruiz (born 20 June 1993 in Barlovento, Miranda) is a Venezuelan athlete specialising in the high jump.

His personal best in the event is 2.31 metres, set in Asunción in 2017. This is the current national record.

Personal bests
High jump: 2.31 m  –  Asunción, 23 June 2017
Triple jump: 15.63 m (wind: +1.5 m/s) –  San Felipe, 30 Aug 2014

Competition record

References

External links

1993 births
Living people
Venezuelan male high jumpers
People from Miranda (state)
Athletes (track and field) at the 2015 Pan American Games
Athletes (track and field) at the 2018 South American Games
Athletes (track and field) at the 2019 Pan American Games
Pan American Games competitors for Venezuela
South American Games gold medalists for Venezuela
South American Games medalists in athletics
Central American and Caribbean Games silver medalists for Venezuela
Competitors at the 2014 Central American and Caribbean Games
Competitors at the 2018 Central American and Caribbean Games
Central American and Caribbean Games medalists in athletics
South American Games gold medalists in athletics
20th-century Venezuelan people
21st-century Venezuelan people